The Călimănel is a right tributary of the river Neagra in Romania. It flows into the Neagra near Panaci.

References

Rivers of Romania
Rivers of Suceava County